Ralph Waldo Rose (March 17, 1885 – October 16, 1913) was an American track and field athlete. He was born in Healdsburg, California.

Biography
Standing 6 ft 5.5 in (197 cm) and weighing 250 pounds (115 kg), Rose was the first shot putter to break 50 feet (15 m). His world record of 51 ft 0 in (15.5 m), set in 1909, lasted for 16 years. In 1904, while at the University of Michigan, he won both the shot put and discus at the Big Ten championships. He subsequently competed for the Olympic Club in San Francisco, California and won seven National AAU titles in the shot, discus, and javelin. A competitor in three Olympic Games, Rose compiled a medal total of three golds, two silver, and one bronze. At the 1904 Summer Olympics in St. Louis, Missouri, he won the shot, was second in the discus, third in the hammer throw, and sixth in the 56-pound (25 kg) weight throw. 

Four years later at the 1908 Summer Olympics in London, he repeated as the shot put champion. At the opening ceremony Rose, the U.S. flag bearer, refused (supported by a majority of his mostly Irish-American teammates) to dip the flag towards the royal box, as athletes from other countries did. Fellow athlete Martin Sheridan supposedly explained Rose's action with the terse statement, "This flag dips to no earthly king."  According to legend, this caused acrimony between the United States and Great Britain. Several decisions by British judges went against American athletes during the games, and U.S. spokesmen felt they stemmed from bias, caused in part by the flag incident. However, there is no reliable evidence that the British spectators objected to Rose's action, nor that Sheridan ever uttered his famous quote, which did not appear in print until 1952.

At the 1908 Summer Olympics Rose competed in the tug of war but was not successful.

In the 1912 Olympics in Stockholm, Sweden, he won the two-handed shot put (throwing a total of 27.70 m (90 ft 10.5 in) with his right and left hands), took second in the regular shot, ninth in the hammer and 11th in the discus.

At the age of 28 he died of typhoid fever, in San Francisco.

References

External links
 Profile
 

1885 births
1913 deaths
People from Healdsburg, California
Sportspeople from the San Francisco Bay Area
Track and field athletes from California
American male shot putters
American male discus throwers
American male javelin throwers
Olympic tug of war competitors of the United States
Tug of war competitors at the 1908 Summer Olympics
Athletes (track and field) at the 1904 Summer Olympics
Athletes (track and field) at the 1908 Summer Olympics
Athletes (track and field) at the 1912 Summer Olympics
Olympic gold medalists for the United States in track and field
Olympic silver medalists for the United States in track and field
Olympic bronze medalists for the United States in track and field
World record setters in athletics (track and field)
Michigan Wolverines men's track and field athletes
Infectious disease deaths in California
Deaths from typhoid fever
Medalists at the 1908 Summer Olympics
Medalists at the 1904 Summer Olympics
Olympic weight throwers